Lavina Tandon is an Indian television actress who started her career as a child artist. She is mainly known for her role of Ruqaiya Sultan Begum in the television series Jodha Akbar.

Filmography

Television

References

External links 
 

Living people
Indian television actresses
Indian film actresses
21st-century Indian actresses
Actresses in Hindi television
Actresses in Hindi cinema
1991 births